DGSN may refer to: 

Direction Générale de Surêté Nationale, or Sûreté Nationale (Morocco)
Direction Générale de Surêté Nationale, the Algerian police
Sunyani Airport, Ghana, ICAO code DGSN